Lauria is a genus of land snails in the family Lauriidae.

Species
Species include:
 Lauria bourbonensis Pilsbry, 1922
 Lauria cryptoplax (Melvill & Ponsonby, 1899)
 Lauria cylindracea (Da Costa, 1778)
 Lauria dadion (Benson, 1864)
 Lauria desiderata (Preston, 1911)
  Lauria fanalensis (R. T. Lowe, 1852)
 Lauria farquhari (Melvill & Ponsonby, 1898)
 Lauria fasciolata (Morelet, 1860)
 Lauria gomerensis D. T. Holyoak & G. A. Holyoak, 2009
 Lauria longa Connolly, 1939
 Lauria reischuetzi Falkner, 1985
 Lauria sempronii (Charpentier, 1837)
 Lauria umbilica  (J. R. Roth, 1839)
 Lauria wouramboulchiensis Connolly, 1928
Species brought into synonymy
 Lauria alluaudi Germain, 1934: synonym of Lauria desiderata (Preston, 1911) (junior synonym)
 Lauria austriaca Wenz, 1921 †: synonym of Leiostyla austriaca (Wenz, 1921) † (new combination)
 Lauria bruguierei (Jickeli, 1874): synonym of Lauria cylindracea (Da Costa, 1778)
 Lauria gottschicki Wenz, 1922 †: synonym of Leiostyla gottschicki (Wenz, 1922) † (new combination)
 Lauria minax O. Boettger, 1889 †: synonym of Minacilla minax (O. Boettger, 1889) † (new combination)
 Lauria paulinae Lindholm, 1913: synonym of Leiostyla paulinae (Lindholm, 1913) (original combination)
 Lauria pulchra (Retowski, 1883): synonym of Leiostyla pulchra (Retowski, 1883)
 Lauria tabularis (Melvill & Ponsonby, 1893): synonym of Lauria cylindracea (Da Costa, 1778) (synonym)
 Lauria tenuimarginata Pilsbry, 1922: synonym of Leiostyla tenuimarginata (Pilsbry, 1922) (original combination)
 Lauria umbilicata (Draparnaud, 1801): synonym of Lauria cylindracea (Da Costa, 1778)
 Lauria zonifera Pilsbry, 1934: synonym of Leiostyla zonifera (Pilsbry, 1934) (original combination)

References

 Bank, R. A. (2017). Classification of the Recent terrestrial Gastropoda of the World. Last update: July 16, 2017

External links
 Boettger, O. (1878). Diagnoses molluscorum novorum a clar. H. Leder in montibus Caucasiis lectorum. Nachrichtsblatt der Deutschen Malakozoologischen Gesellschaft. 10 (8): 120-124. Frankfurt am Main
 Pilsbry, H. A. (1922-1926). Manual of conchology, structural and systematic, with illustrations of the species. Ser. 2, Pulmonata. Vol. 27: Pupillidae (Orculinae, Pagodulinae, Acanthinulinae, etc.). pp i-iv, 1-369, pls 1-32. Philadelphia, published by the Conchological Department, Academy of Natural Sciences

 
Lauriidae
Taxa named by John Edward Gray